New Jersey's 1st congressional district is a congressional district in the U.S. state of New Jersey. The district, which includes Camden and South Jersey suburbs of Philadelphia, has been represented by Democrat Donald Norcross since November 2014. It is among the most reliably Democratic districts in New Jersey, as it is mainly made up of Democratic-dominated Camden County.

Counties and municipalities in the district
For the 118th and successive Congresses, based on redistricting following the 2020 census, the district contains all or portions of three counties and 52 municipalities.

Burlington County (2)
Maple Shade Township, Palmyra

Camden County (36)
All 36 municipalities

Gloucester County (14)
Deptford Township, East Greenwich Township (part, also 2nd), Glassboro, Mantua, Monroe Township, National Park, Paulsboro, Pitman, Washington Township, Wenonah, West Deptford Township, Westville, Woodbury Heights, Woodbury

Recent election results in statewide races

List of members representing the district

1789–1813: One seat

1813–1815: Two seats
From 1813 to 1815, two seats were apportioned, elected at-large on a general ticket.

All seats elected  starting in 1815.

1843–present: One seat

Recent election results

2012

2014

2016

2018

2020

2022

References

Sources

 Congressional Biographical Directory of the United States 1774–present

01
Burlington County, New Jersey
Camden County, New Jersey
Gloucester County, New Jersey
Constituencies established in 1799
1799 establishments in New Jersey
Constituencies disestablished in 1801
1801 disestablishments in New Jersey
Constituencies established in 1813
1813 establishments in New Jersey
Constituencies disestablished in 1815
1815 disestablishments in New Jersey
Constituencies established in 1843
1843 establishments in New Jersey